Thomas Carl Edwards Jr. (January 14, 1911 – March 14, 1977) was an American professional basketball player. He played in the National Basketball League for the Toledo Jim White Chevrolets in one game during the 1941–42 season and scored one point.

References 

1911 births
1977 deaths
American men's basketball players
Basketball players from Ohio
Forwards (basketball)
Sportspeople from Toledo, Ohio
Toledo Jim White Chevrolets players